VOTP may refer to:

Tirupati Airport's ICAO code
Valley of the Pharaohs role-playing game
The Voice of the People, a collection of folk songs
VOTP Records, a record label founded by Billy Jenkins
Violent Offenders Treatment Program, a psychological program used in prisons and secure psychiatric hospitals*

See also 
 Voice of the people (disambiguation)